Belfast is a former town in Licking County, in the U.S. state of Ohio.

History
By 1917, Belfast was described as "virtually extinct".

References

Geography of Licking County, Ohio
Former populated places in Ohio